Star of Africa or Cullinan Diamond is the largest gem-quality rough diamond ever found.

Star of Africa or African Star may also refer to:
 Africa Star, a military campaign medal for Commonwealth veterans of the Second World War campaign in North Africa
 African Stars F.C., a Namibian soccer club
Black Star of Africa, symbol of  Ghana or Africa
 Order of the Star of Africa, a Liberian honour
 Order of the African Star, a Congo Free State honour
 Afrikan tähti or Star of Africa, a board game
 Der Stern von Afrika or The Star of Africa, a 1957 film
 Hans-Joachim Marseille, a German fighter ace during World War II who was nicknamed the Star of Africa

See also
 African sea star, a starfish
 African star grass
 African star flower
 Black Star of Africa symbol of Africa
 Star Africa Commodities & Minerals Limited, a Ghanaian company
 Star of North Africa, Algerian nationalist organization
 Star of South Africa (disambiguation)